The Third Council of Lima was a council of the Roman Catholic Church in 1582–83 in Lima, at the time the capital of the Spanish Viceroyalty of Peru. It was the most important of the three councils celebrated in Lima during the 16th century, since it definitively organized the Church in the Americas. It was summoned by Archbishop Toribio de Mogrovejo in 1581, and met from 15 August 1582 to 18 October 1583.

The Council dictated many regulations and principles, centered on the evangelization of the aboriginals and their fair treatment "not like slaves but as free men", as well as their education and instruction in European customs. It decreed that the indigenous languages must be used, and forbade the use of Latin and the exclusive use of Spanish. It produced a trilingual catechism (then known as "Catechism of St. Toribius"), in Spanish, Quechua and Aymara. This catechism was later translated into the Guaraní language by Luis de Bolaños, and adopted by the First Synod of Asunción (1603) for use in the area of the Upper Paraná River basin (eastern Brazil, Paraguay and northeastern Argentina).

The Council also encouraged the establishment of seminaries. It set standards for the ordination of priests, requiring that they visit their congregations regularly, and for the appropriate use of liturgy to attract the natives to the celebrations.

Contrary to popular belief, the Council did not ban or order the burning of all Quipus in 1583. They only banned quipus that they were considered idolatrous objects and an obstacle to religious conversion. But the Council also advocated for the use of quipus for confession and other ecclesiastical purposes.

References

  Santo Toribio de Mogrovejo, patrono del episcopado iberoamericano.

History of South America
Colonial Peru
Lima 3
Lima 3
1582 establishments in South America
1583 disestablishments
Spanish colonization of the Americas
16th century in South America
1582 in South America
1583 in South America
16th century in Peru